Kerry Reid and Wendy Turnbull were the defending champions, but decided not to play together. Reid teamed up with Anne Smith and lost in third round to Françoise Dürr and Virginia Wade, while Turnbull teamed up with Betty Stöve.

Billie Jean King and Martina Navratilova defeated Stöve and Turnbull in the final, 5–7, 6–3, 6–2 to win the ladies' doubles tennis title at the 1979 Wimbledon Championships. It was the 10th Wimbledon title, 15th Grand Slam title for King, and the 2nd Wimbledon title, 5th Grand Slam title for Navratilova, in their respective doubles careers.

Seeds

  Billie Jean King /  Martina Navratilova (champions)
  Betty Stöve /  Wendy Turnbull (final)
  Françoise Dürr /  Virginia Wade (semifinals)
  Rosie Casals /  Chris Evert Lloyd (quarterfinals)
  Dianne Fromholtz /  Marise Kruger (quarterfinals)
  Mima Jaušovec /  Virginia Ruzici (semifinals)
  Ilana Kloss /  Betty Ann Stuart (quarterfinals)
  Sue Barker /  Ann Kiyomura (quarterfinals)

Draw

Finals

Top half

Section 1

Section 2

Bottom half

Section 3

Section 4

References

External links

1979 Wimbledon Championships – Women's draws and results at the International Tennis Federation

Women's Doubles
Wimbledon Championship by year – Women's doubles
Wimbledon Championships
Wimbledon Championships